Le Lardin-Saint-Lazare is a commune in the Dordogne department in Nouvelle-Aquitaine in southwestern France. Condat-Le Lardin station has rail connections to Bordeaux, Périgueux and Brive-la-Gaillarde.

Population

See also
Communes of the Dordogne department

References

Communes of Dordogne